Émile Lombard (Liège) was a Belgian professional road bicycle racer, who raced the 1904 Tour de France. During the race, after the second stage, Lombard was in 4th place. Because that year's race was filled with disqualifications because riders were accused of taking trains, in November 1904 it was decided that several players were disqualified, including the three cyclists that were standing above Lombard after the second stage, and as a result Lombard had been leading the general classification for one day.

Palmarès 

1902
 amateur road race championship

External links 

Belgian male cyclists
Year of death missing
Sportspeople from Liège
Cyclists from Liège Province
Year of birth missing